S. Ramaswamy Naidu (c. 1901 – 9 January 1969) was an Indian politician and former Member of the Legislative Assembly. He was elected to the Tamil Nadu legislative assembly as an Indian National Congress candidate from Sattur constituency in 1952 election, from Sivakasi constituency in 1957 and 1962 elections as Indian National Congress candidate. He was again elected from Sattur constituency as a Swatantra Party candidate in 1967 election.

References

External links 
Sri S.Ramasamy Naidu Memorial College, Sattur

Indian National Congress politicians from Tamil Nadu
Mayors of Chennai
1969 deaths
Year of birth uncertain
People from Virudhunagar district
20th-century Indian politicians
Members of the Tamil Nadu Legislative Assembly